Vanessa braziliensis, the Brazilian painted lady, is a butterfly of the family Nymphalidae found in
Brazil, Ecuador, Peru, Bolivia, Venezuela, Paraguay, Uruguay and northern Argentina.

References

External links
Butterflies of the Amazon and Andes - Brazilian painted lady

Butterflies described in 1883
braziliensis
Taxa named by Frederic Moore
Nymphalidae of South America